KULO (94.3 FM, "Cool 94.3") is a radio station in Alexandria, Minnesota, with an oldies format. KULO plays 'The Lakes Greatest Hits' including the best music from the 1970s to the 1990s.

It originally started out in 1976 as KMSR broadcasting out of Sauk Centre, Minnesota, then was moved into Alexandria. KIKV-FM is a sister station to COOL 94.3. Both stations are located at 604 3rd Ave. West in Alexandria, MN.

Cool 94.3 is also home to the Lakes Area's Christmas music station.  On the day after Thanksgiving Cool 94.3 switches over to a Christmas music format through Christmas Day.

Hubbard Broadcasting, Inc. announced on November 13, 2014 that it would purchase the Omni Broadcasting stations, including KULO. Hubbard already owned television station KSAX (channel 42, a satellite of KSTP-TV) in Alexandria. The sale was completed on February 27, 2015, at a purchase price of $8 million for the 16 stations and one translator.

On-air personalities
Mornings: Amy Foxx
Middays: Amy Foxx
Afternoons: Mike Ryan
Evenings: Tony Lorino

References

External links
Cool 94.3 official website

Radio stations in Alexandria, Minnesota
Oldies radio stations in the United States
Hubbard Broadcasting